The Great Paris Concert is a 1973 live double album by jazz pianist Duke Ellington preserving pieces of a series of performances given in Paris during February 1963, a decade prior the release. Several of the tracks were previously edited and included in Duke Ellington's Greatest Hits. Those edited tracks were included on the 1989 CD re-release of The Great Paris Concert.

Track listing
All tracks written by Duke Ellington unless otherwise noted.
All tracks live.

"Kinda Dukish" – 1:52
"Rockin' in Rhythm" (Harry Carney, Ellington, Irving Mills) – 3:47
"On the Sunny Side of the Street" (Dorothy Fields, Jimmy McHugh) – 2:58
"The Star-Crossed Lovers" (Ellington, Billy Strayhorn) – 4:18
"All of Me" (Gerald Marks, Seymour Simons) – 2:35
"Theme from the Asphalt Jungle" – 4:08
"Concerto for Cootie" – 2:31
"Tutti for Cootie" (Ellington, Jimmy Hamilton) – 4:46
"Suite Thursday: Misfit Blues" (Ellington, Strayhorn) – 3:39
"Suite Thursday: Schwiphti" (Ellington, Strayhorn) – 2:50
"Suite Thursday: Zweet Zurzday" (Ellington, Strayhorn) – 3:55
"Suite Thursday: Lay-By" (Ellington, Strayhorn) – 6:25
"Perdido" (Ervin Drake, H.J. Lengsfelder, Juan Tizol) – 5:22
"The Eighth Veil" (Ellington, Strayhorn) – 2:33
"Rose of the Rio Grande" (Ross Gorman, Edgar Leslie, Harry Warren) – 2:41
"Cop Out" – 6:58
"Bula" – 4:42
"Jam With Sam" – 3:51
"Happy Go Lucky Local" – 3:25
"Tone Parallel to Harlem" – 14:05

Additional tracks on 1989 re-release
"Don't Get Around Much Anymore" (Ellington, Bob Russell) – 2:33
"Do Nothin' Till You Hear From Me" (Ellington, Russell) – 4:33
"Black and Tan Fantasy" (Ellington, Bubber Miley) – 2:43
"Creole Love Call" – 2:08
"The Mooche" – 5:38
"Things Ain't What They Used to Be" (Mercer Ellington, Ted Persons) – 2:53
"Pyramid" (Ellington, Irving Gordon, Mills, Tizol) – 3:25
"The Blues" – 3:36
"Echoes of Harlem" – 3:32
"Satin Doll" – (Ellington, Mercer, Strayhorn) – 2:27

Personnel
Cat Anderson – trumpet
Lawrence Brown – trombone
Roy Burrowes – trumpet
Harry Carney – clarinet, baritone saxophone
Chuck Connors – trombone
Buster Cooper – trombone
Duke Ellington – piano
Paul Gonsalves – tenor saxophone
Milt Grayson – vocals
Jimmy Hamilton – clarinet, tenor saxophone
Johnny Hodges – alto saxophone
Ray Nance – violin, cornet
Russell Procope – clarinet, alto saxophone
Ernie Shepard – bass
Cootie Williams – trumpet
Sam Woodyard – drums
Stanley Dance –  liner notes
Ilhan Mimaroglu – reissue producer, production coordination, editing, sequencing, original collating
Giuseppe Pino –  liner notes, photography
Popsie –  liner notes
Bob Porter – reissue producer
Fred Seligo – liner notes

References

1973 live albums
Duke Ellington live albums
Live big band albums
Atlantic Records live albums